Ta Pang Po is a village located on the Tsing Chau Tsai Peninsula of Lantau Island, in the Tsuen Wan District of Hong Kong.

Administration
Ta Pang Po is a recognized village under the New Territories Small House Policy.

References

External links
 Delineation of area of existing village Ta Pang Po (Ma Wan) for election of resident representative (2019 to 2022)

Villages in Tsuen Wan District, Hong Kong
Lantau Island